was a Japanese communist who joined the Republic of China during the Second Sino-Japanese War. Aoyama was on good terms with the Kuomintang, despite openly admitting he was a Communist. While Aoyama was in Chongqing, he successfully sold a printing plant to the Office of War Information (OWI). Aoyama replaced Wataru Kaji as a "psychological advisor", re-educating captured Japanese soldiers.

See also 
 Japanese dissidence during the Shōwa period
 Japanese in the Chinese resistance to the Empire of Japan
 Japanese People's Emancipation League

References

Further reading
 Kuroda, Zenji, (1972). 反戦政略 中国からみた日本戦前・戦中・戦後. Misaki Shobō Publishing. OCLC 44418352.
 青山和夫, (1957). 謀略熟練工. 妙義出版株式会社.

Second Sino-Japanese War
Japanese rebels
Japanese communists
Year of birth missing
Year of death missing